Célestine N'Drin (born 20 July 1963) is a Côte d'Ivoire track and field athlete who specialized in the 400 and 800 metres. She represented her country at the Summer Olympics on three occasions: 1976, 1984 and 1988. She was the first woman to represent the Ivory Coast at the Olympics.

Achievements

Personal bests
400 metres - 52.04 s (1988) - national record.
800 metres - 2:02.99 min (1990) - national record

References

External links

1963 births
Living people
Ivorian female sprinters
Athletes (track and field) at the 1976 Summer Olympics
Athletes (track and field) at the 1984 Summer Olympics
Athletes (track and field) at the 1988 Summer Olympics
Olympic athletes of Ivory Coast
Ivorian female middle-distance runners
African Games bronze medalists for Ivory Coast
African Games medalists in athletics (track and field)
Athletes (track and field) at the 1978 All-Africa Games
Olympic female sprinters